Aveparvovirus is a genus of viruses, in the subfamily Parvovirinae of the virus family Parvoviridae. There are three species in this genus. Diseases associated with this genus include: enteric disease and malabsorption syndrome.

Taxonomy
The following three species are assigned to the genus:

 Columbid aveparvovirus 1
 Galliform aveparvovirus 1
 Gruiform aveparvovirus 1

Structure
Viruses in Aveparvovirus are non-enveloped, with icosahedral and round geometries, and T=1 symmetry. The diameter is around 18-26 nm. Genomes are linear, around 6kb in length.

Life cycle
Viral replication is nuclear. Entry into the host cell is achieved by attachment to host receptors, and is probably driven by clathrin-mediated endocytosis. Replication follows the rolling-hairpin model. DNA-templated transcription, with some alternative splicing mechanism is the method of transcription. Its cell exit strategy remains to be determined but probably involves cell lysis, as seen for other parvoviruses,.
Birds serve as the natural host.

References

External links
 Viralzone: Aveparvovirus
 ICTV Aveparvovirus 2018

Parvovirinae
Bird diseases
Virus genera